The Cultivation System was a Dutch government policy from 1830–1870 for its Dutch East Indies colony (now Indonesia). Requiring a portion of agricultural production to be devoted to export crops, it is referred to by Indonesian historians as tanam paksa ("enforced planting").

Background

Despite increasing returns from the Dutch system of land tax, Dutch finances had been severely affected by the cost of the Java War and Padri Wars.  The Belgian Revolution in 1830 and the resulting costs of keeping the Dutch army at a war footing until 1839 brought the Netherlands to the brink of bankruptcy. In 1830, a new governor general, Johannes van den Bosch, was appointed to increase the exploitation of the Dutch East Indies' resources. The Cultivation System was implemented only on land controlled directly by the colonial government, thus exempting the Vorstenlanden (princely states) and the particuliere landerijen (private domains).

Implementation

The cultivation system was primarily implemented in Java, the center of the colonial state. Instead of land taxes, 20% of village land had to be devoted to government crops for export or, alternatively, peasants had to work in government-owned plantations for 60 days of the year. To allow the enforcement of these policies, Javanese villagers were more formally linked to their villages and were sometimes prevented from traveling freely around the island without permission. As a result of this policy, much of Java became a Dutch plantation. Some remarks while in theory only 20% of land were used as export crop plantation or peasants have to work for 66 days, in practice they used more portions of lands (same sources claim nearly reach 100%) until native populations had little to plant food crops which result famine in many areas and, sometimes, peasants still had to work more than 66 days.

To handle and process the cash crops, the Dutch set up a network of local middlemen who profited greatly and so had a vested interest in the system: compradores somewhat like the cottier system in Ireland. It was financed partly by bonds sold to the Dutch themselves and partly by introducing a new copper coinage at about a 2:1 ratio to the old, thereby gaining a massive seigneurage from the depreciation at the expense of the local economy. From Some Notes on Java and its Administration by the Dutch, by Henry Scott Boys, 1892:

'An ingenious device for increasing the Government profit was devised by General Van-der Bosch at the same time as he initiated the culture system. An enormous amount of copper coinage was manufactured in Holland, the intrinsic value being rather less than half the nominal value. This coinage was made a legal tender, and the cultivator was paid for his produce in this copper coin. Thus, as Mr. Money in his work Java; or, How to Manage a Colony, naively remarks:- "The loans, raised in Holland to start the system, produced an effect in Java equal to double their amount."'

Effects
The policy brought the Dutch enormous wealth through export growth, averaging around 14%. It brought the Netherlands back from the brink of bankruptcy and made the Dutch East Indies self-sufficient and profitable extremely quickly. As early as 1831, the policy allowed the Dutch East Indies budget to be balanced, and the surplus revenue was used to pay off debts left over from the defunct VOC régime. The cultivation system is linked, however, to famines and epidemics in the 1840s, firstly in Cirebon and then Central Java, as cash crops such as indigo and sugar had to be grown instead of rice.

Political pressures in the Netherlands resulting partly from the problems and partly from rent seeking independent merchants who preferred free trade or local preference (see the Henry Scott Boys work cited above) eventually led to the system's abolition (c. 1870) and replacement with free-market Liberal Period in which private enterprise was encouraged.

See also
 Landrentestelsel
 Max Havelaar

References

Further reading
 

Dutch East Indies
Economic history of Indonesia